Chen Hongjun (陈红军;20 March 1987 – 16 June 2020) was a battalion commander in the People's Liberation Army. He was killed during the 2020–2022 China–India skirmishes and was posthumously decorated with the July 1 Medal for his efforts during the skirmish.

Life 
Chen Hongjun was born into a farming family in March 1987 in Zhangjia Village, Liangdang County, Longnan. Along with his studies he helped his family, looking after the cattle and cutting bamboo baskets. He would help his neighbours with farms work. He attended the local school in Liangdang County after which he was admitted to Northwest Normal University in 2005, and graduated in psychology in 2009. Although he had passed exams for the police, he decided to join the army.

Aftermath 

Chen died when he was 33, leaving behind his pregnant wife, Xiao Jianwen. The retired military affairs departments of Shaanxi and Gansu provinces provided medical support to Xiao. As she had a degree in music, she was given a teaching job in the Xi'an Conservatory of Music. Chen's son was born on 25 October 2020, and officials in China then worked on settling both mother and son in Xi'an.

References 

1987 births
2020 deaths
People from Longnan
People's Liberation Army officers
Chinese military personnel killed in action
Northwest Normal University alumni